Events from the year 1838 in Denmark.

Incumbents
 Monarch – Frederick VI
 Prime minister – Otto Joachim

Events

 17 September – After almost four decades in Rome, Bertel Thorvaldsen, accompanied by his art collections and most of his own works, returns to Copenhagen.

Undated

Births
 6 February – Johan Peter Christian Hansen, businessman (died 1913)
 22 February – Johan Peter Andreas Anker, military officer (died 1876)
 19 June – Julius Lange, art historian (died 1896)
 31 July – Vilhelm Rosenstand, artist (died 1915)

Deaths
 13 March – Poul Martin Møller, academic, writer, and poet (born 1794)
 20 April – Marie Kofoed, businessperson and philanthropist (born 1760)
 31 October – Poul Reichhardt, actor (born 1913)

References

 
1830s in Denmark
Denmark
Years of the 19th century in Denmark